Kariz-e Now (also Romanized as Kārīz-e Now, Kārīz Now, and Kārīz-i-Nau) is a village in Barakuh Rural District, Jolgeh-e Mazhan District, Khusf County, South Khorasan Province, Iran. At the 2006 census, its population was 67, in 23 families.

References 

Populated places in Khusf County